Liberty Hill is an unincorporated community in Greene County, Tennessee, United States.

References

Unincorporated communities in Greene County, Tennessee
Unincorporated communities in Tennessee